Major John Pitcairn (28 December 1722 – 17 June 1775) was a British military officer. Born in Dysart, Fife, he enlisted in the Marine Forces  at the age of 23 and was stationed in North America during the French and Indian War, serving at the rank of captain. Arriving in Boston in 1774 as part of a British occupation of the city, he fought in the 1775 battles of Lexington and Concord during the outbreak of the American War of Independence. Two months later in June, Pitcairn was killed in action during the battle of Bunker Hill. Respected by both his men and Pitcairn's American opponents, he was buried at Boston's Old North Church.

Early life and education

Pitcairn was born in 1722 in Dysart, a port town in Fife, Scotland. His parents were the Reverend David Pitcairn and Katherine (Hamilton) Pitcairn. An older brother, was William Pitcairn, who later became a botanist, doctor and president of the Royal College of Physicians.

John Pitcairn entered the Marines when he was twenty-three, was commissioned as a lieutenant in 1746, served in Canada during the French and Indian War as a captain, and was promoted to major in 1771. In 1774 he arrived in Boston, Massachusetts, in command of 600 Marines assigned to support the British forces in the increasingly resistive colony.

Career

John Pitcairn was respected by the citizens in Boston as one of the more reasonable officers in the occupying force. He was in command of the advance party that marched on Lexington and Concord on 19 April 1775, which began the American War of Independence. His horse was shot from under him, and he lost a pair of matched pistols when the column's baggage was abandoned. Patriot leader Israel Putnam would carry them through the rest of the war.

Death
At the Battle of Bunker Hill two months later, Major Pitcairn commanded a reserve force of about 300 Marines. They landed at the south end of the Charlestown peninsula. When the first assaults failed, Pitcairn led his men up the hill toward the American position. Although already being wounded by two gunshots, he led his men through the rebel trenches. When he entered the trenches, he was shot four times, including the final blow, which was a wound to the head, said to have been fired by a former slave named Peter Salem. He toppled into the arms of his son, Thomas, also a Marine officer, who cried out, "I have lost my father!" Some Marines tried to console the son, while others, overcome with emotion, openly wept. Pitcairn was carried back to Boston, where he died of his wound within hours. He is buried at the Old North Church in Boston. After the battle, several marines said they "had all lost a father".

John Trumbull's painting of the Battle of Bunker Hill depicts Pitcairn's death, though with several errors and anachronisms. Since no portrait of him is known to exist, Pitcairn's son David Pitcairn was used as a model by Trumbull. The uniform depicted in it was not actually adopted by the Marines until the 1780s. Pitcairn is shown falling at the crest at its capture from the American force, while he was actually shot starting to climb the hill. Major Pitcairn is also depicted at the painting of the Battle of Lexington in the U.S. Capitol rotunda.

Family
John Pitcairn married Elizabeth Dalrymple (1724–1809), a daughter of Robert Dalrymple. Together they had four other sons and four daughters. One son, Robert Pitcairn, was a midshipman in the Royal Navy. On 3 July 1767 the 15-year-old boy, aboard the sloop HMS Swallow, was the first person to sight an unknown island in the south Pacific. The captain named the island Pitcairn's Island in the boy's honour. Later, in 1770, Robert Pitcairn was aboard an East India Company ship that vanished without trace en route to the Comoro Islands. Another daughter, Catherine Pitcairn, married Charles Cochrane, son of the 8th Earl of Dundonald and a first cousin of Admiral Thomas Cochrane, 10th Earl of Dundonald.

In popular culture
Pitcairn appears in April Morning, a 1961 novel by Howard Fast depicting the Battles of Lexington and Concord. Pitcairn is also a character in the novel Johnny Tremain.
Pitcairn is a secondary antagonist in the video game Assassin's Creed III. Pitcairn was rescued and recruited by Haytham Kenway to support the Templars' aims of controlling a fledgling America's future in the name of the Templar Order. In the game, he can either be assassinated on his horse from high in the trees during the Battle of Bunker Hill or fought as a boss, by the protagonist Kanienʼkehá꞉ka Assassin Ratonhnhaké:ton.
Pitcairn is a supporting character in the History Channel's three-part miniseries Sons of Liberty which aired in 2015. He is portrayed by Irish actor Kevin Ryan.
Pitcairn's tomb can be found in the video game Fallout 4, in the Railroad's headquarters, found under the Old North Church's ruins, in Boston. This corresponds with where Pitcairn actually was laid to rest.

References

External links

Major JOHN PITCAIRN, Marines

1722 births
1775 deaths
British military personnel killed in the American Revolutionary War
British military personnel of the French and Indian War
Royal Navy personnel of the American Revolutionary War
People from Dysart, Fife
Royal Marines officers
Scottish soldiers